The Žiedupė (or Žiedupys) is a river of Kėdainiai district municipality, Kaunas County, central Lithuania. It is a left tributary of the river Šušvė.

It flows mostly southwards and meets the Šušvė nearby Plaktiniai village. Josvainiai village, Pažiedupys and Plaktiniai are located on the banks of the Žiedupė.

The name Žiedupė is a compound noun and derives from the Lithuanian words žiedas ('flower, blosom' or 'ring') and upė ('river').

References
 LIETUVOS RESPUBLIKOS UPIŲ IR TVENKINIŲ KLASIFIKATORIUS (Republic of Lithuania- River and Pond Classifications).  Ministry of Environment (Lithuania). Accessed 2011-11-17.

Rivers of Lithuania
Kėdainiai District Municipality